Deer Valley is an organized hamlet in the Rural  Municipality of Lumsden No. 189, Saskatchewan, Canada.

History 
The development of the Deer Valley community began in 1998. It was established as an organized hamlet on December 31, 2016.

Government 
Deer Valley has a three-member organized hamlet board that is chaired by Kristen Abel. The board reports to the Rural Municipality of Lumsden No. 189 as its administering municipality.

References

External links 

Lumsden No. 189, Saskatchewan
Organized hamlets in Saskatchewan
Division No. 6, Saskatchewan